In taekwondo, taegeuk is a set of Pumsae (also known as Poomsae or Poomse), or defined pattern of defense-and-attack forms used to teach taekwondo.  

Between 1967 and 1971, Kukkiwon-style taekwondo made use of an older set of forms called the palgwae forms developed by the Korea Taekwondo Association (KTA) with input from some of the original nine kwans of taekwondo. By 1970, additional kwans had joined the KTA so the newer set of taegeuk forms was developed to better represent inputs from all the participating kwans. By 1971, the palgwae forms were considered to be deprecated in favor of the newer taegeuk forms, though some schools still teach palgwae forms as well. All World Taekwondo Federation (WTF) Pumsae competitions use the taegeuk pumsae, along with 8 of the black belt Pumsae.

To gain a black belt, a student generally must know all eight Taegeuk Poomsae and also be able to perform all of them consecutively with no breaks in between.

Each Taegeuk form symbolizes a specific state thought to be indicative of the belt the student currently holds, and is represented in WTF Taekwondo by trigrams (originally derived from the I-Ching) similar to those found in the four corners of the South Korean flag.

Taegeuk Poomsae
Many schools require that form practice begin with a bow to the flag and/or instructor, but the motions of the forms themselves do not require the bow, nor is it necessary in personal practice.

See also
Taekwondo
 Hyeong (poomsae)

References

Taekwondo